Castello Cantelmo (Italian for Cantelmo Castle)  is a  Middle Ages castle in Pettorano sul Gizio, province of L'Aquila, Abruzzo, southern-central Italy.

The castle, built around the 11th century, overlooks the Gizio river valley and the Valle Peligna. It has an irregular plan with cylindrical, massive towers at the north-western and south-western corners, while at south-eastern one are the remains of a quadrangular tower. In the middle is a pentagonal tower, which is the most ancient part of the castle.

References

External links

Cantelmo, Pettorano sul Gizio
Pettorano sul Gizio